The Quitaque Railway Tunnel or Clarity Tunnel is a  abandoned railway tunnel in Floyd County, Texas about  southwest of Quitaque. Construction started in 1927, and the tunnel and associated railway line were completed and opened for use in 1930. The tunnel was listed on the National Register of Historic Places in 1977, and was designated a Texas State Antiquities Landmark in 2003.

The Fort Worth and Denver South Plains Railroad Company built the tunnel for its own use. Irish and Swedish immigrants comprised the construction crews. The tunnel cuts through sandstone of the Caprock Escarpment, about 50 feet below its ridge of about 2,800 elevation. After a train wreck in the tunnel in 1973, the line was closed for eighteen months while the tunnel was shortened to its current length, and the rails were upgraded to handle heavier traffic. As of 1976, it was one of very few railway tunnels still in use in Texas.

The line was abandoned in 1989. In 1993, the Texas Parks and Wildlife Department acquired the abandoned right-of-way, and the tunnel is now part of Caprock Canyons State Park and Trailway.

See also

National Register of Historic Places listings in Floyd County, Texas

References

Tunnels in Texas
National Register of Historic Places in Floyd County, Texas
Tunnels completed in 1930